Maternity is being a mother.

Maternity also may refer to:

 Maternity (film), a 1917 American silent film
 "Maternity" (House), a television episode
 Maternity (play), a 1915 English-language production of a 1904 play by Eugène Brieux

See also
 
 Motherhood (disambiguation)
 "Manternity" (Black-ish), a television episode
 Parental leave, an employee benefit